The 1972–73 Divizia B was the 33rd season of the second tier of the Romanian football league system.

The format has been maintained to two series, each of them having 16 teams. At the end of the season the winners of the series promoted to Divizia A and none of the teams relegated to Divizia C due to expansion of the league starting with the 1973–74 season.

Team changes

To Divizia B
Promoted from Divizia C
 Delta Tulcea
 Gloria Buzău
 Metalul Turnu Severin
 Metrom Brașov

Relegated from Divizia A
 Politehnica Iași
 Crișul Oradea

From Divizia B
Relegated to Divizia C
 Poiana Câmpina
 Gaz Metan Mediaș
 Portul Constanța
 Vulturii Textila Lugoj

Promoted to Divizia A
 Sportul Studențesc
 CSM Reșița

Renamed teams 
Chimia Făgăraș was renamed as Nitramonia Făgăraș.

Crișul Oradea was renamed as FC Bihor Oradea.

Metalul Târgoviște was renamed as CS Târgoviște.

Politehnica Galați was renamed as CSU Galați.

League tables

Serie I

Serie II

See also 
 1972–73 Divizia A
 1972–73 Divizia C
 1972–73 County Championship

References

Liga II seasons
Romania
2